The Sanxingdui Museum is located in the northeast corner of the ruins of Sanxingdui, which is at the bank of Duck River in the west of Guanghan City, Sichuan Province, known as a famous historical and cultural city. It is 38 kilometers north from Chengdu and 26 kilometers south from Deyang. It is a large modern thematic museum. The foundation of the museum was laid in August 1992 and it was formally opened to the public in October 1997.

Exhibition halls 

Sanxingdui Museum covers an area of about 33 hectares of which the afforested area is over 80%. There are two exhibition halls in the museum, including the First Exhibition Hall and the Second Exhibition Hall. The display area is nearly 12000 square meters. The First Exhibition Hall exhibits gold, copper, jade, stone, pottery, etc. while the Second Exhibition Hall is specially used to exhibit bronze.

Influence 
Since the opening of the museum, it has received more than three million domestic and foreign visitors. Many national leaders have visited including Jiang Zemin and Hu Jintao. The Sanxingdui cultural relics have been presented in Switzerland, Germany, the UK, Denmark, America, Japan, Australia, France, and so on since 1993, and have aroused great interest wherever they have been displayed.

See also
 List of museums in China

References 

1997 establishments in China
Museums in Sichuan
Museums established in 1997
Archaeological museums in China
National first-grade museums of China